Clyde Cook was an American cinematographer active during Hollywood's silent era.

Biography 
Clyde was born in Pennsylvania to Daniel Cook and Minerva Kelts. The family later relocated to Bernalillo, New Mexico, where Clyde married his wife, Isabelle Connelly. Clyde began working as a cinematographer in the earliest days of Hollywood, and racked up experience lensing films for directors like Henry MacRae, Rex Ingram, and Raymond West.

Selected filmography 

 Bow Wow (1922)
 The Deceiver (1920)
 The Man Who Had Everything (1920)
 The Golden Trail (1920)
 A Double-Dyed Deceiver (1920)
 All Wrong (1919)
 Wife or Country (1918)
 Love's Pay Day (1918)
 Mystic Faces (1918)
 Humdrum Brown (1918)
 Up or Down? (1917)
 Broadway Arizona (1917)
 Mr. Opp (1917)
 The Show Down (1917)
 The Greater Law (1917) 
 Southern Justice (1917)
 Mutiny (1917)
 God's Crucible (1917)
 The End of the Rainbow (1916)
 A Romance of Billy Goat Hill (1916)
 The Girl of Lost Lake (1916)
 Into the Primitive (1916)

References 

American cinematographers
1890 births
1936 deaths